The 1989 Women's European Volleyball Championship was the sixteenth edition of the event, organised by Europe's governing volleyball body, the Confédération Européenne de Volleyball. It was hosted in several cities in West Germany from 2 to 10 September 1989, with the final round held in Stuttgart.

Participating teams

Format
The tournament was played in two different stages. In the first stage, the twelve participants were divided in two groups of six teams each. A single round-robin format was played within each group to determine the teams' group position. The second stage of the tournament consisted of three sets of semifinals to determine the tournament final ranking. The group stage firsts and seconds played the semifinals for 1st to 4th place, group stage thirds and fourths played the 5th to 8th place semifinals and group stage fifths and sixths played the 9th to 12th semifinals. The pairing of the semifinals was made so teams played against the opposite group teams which finished in a different position (1st played against 2nd, 3rd played against 4th and 5th played against 6th).

Pools composition

Squads

Venues

Preliminary round

Pool A
venue location: Hamburg, West Germany

|}

|}

Pool B
venue location: Karlsruhe, West Germany

|}

|}

Final round

9th–12th place
 Pools A and B fifth and sixth positions play each other.
venue location: Sindelfingen, West Germany

9th–12th semifinals

|}

11th place match

|}

9th place match

|}

5th–8th place
 Pools A and B third and fourth positions play each other.
venue location: Stuttgart, West Germany

5th–8th semifinals

|}

7th place match

|}

5th place match

|}

Final
 Pools A and B first and second positions play each other.
venue location: Stuttgart, West Germany

Semifinals

|}

3rd place match

|}

Final

|}

Final ranking

Individual awards
MVP: 
Best Spiker: 
Best Server: 
Best Blocker: 
Best Setter: 
Best Receiver: 
Best Digger:

References
 Confédération Européenne de Volleyball (CEV)

External links
 Results at todor66.com

European Volleyball Championships
Women's European Volleyball Championships
International volleyball competitions hosted by West Germany
1989 in West German women's sport
Women's volleyball in West Germany
September 1989 sports events in Europe